Lilian Dikmans (born 12 December 1985) is an Australian model, founder of Real Food Healthy Body, Muay Thai fighter and author at Fightmag from Melbourne. She has become the first Australian model simultaneously partaking in Muay Thai bouts.

Modelling career
Dikmans has been represented by Vivien's Models in Australia. Signing with the modelling agency shortly after finishing high school she worked as a model while completing her university studies appearing in television commercials for Sony, Just Car Insurance  and Just Jeans.

After completing her university studies Dikmans worked as a lawyer before returning to modelling in late 2016. Shortly after her return, she was cast as the hero in national television commercials for Pure Blonde and Kmart Australia.

A model in the fitness space, Dikmans appeared on the August 2017 cover of Women's Health and Fitness Magazine  with a feature article covering her career and body secrets.

With her involvement in the combat sport of Muay Thai, Dikmans has participated in fight-inspired active wear campaigns for brands such as Lululemon Athletica and Russell Athletic. She has also appeared on the 2017 cover of international online publication FIGHTMAG. In February 2019 Dikmans appeared as the hero in a Ford Focus ST Line TV Commercial, featuring her Muay Thai skills.

In September 2017 Dikmans was among "5 Models Who Get Runway Ready With Martial Arts" in the Evolve MMA, alongside Demi Lovato, Adriana Lima, Mia Kang, Gigi Hadid.

In April 2019 Dikmans was cast in four-episode Ford "Like You Mean It" mini-series alongside world champion surfer Harley Ingleby, Australian DJ Tigerlily, and motivational speaker and podcaster Matt Purcell.

In July 2019 Dikmans appeared in the Maybelline "Generation Fluid" campaign covering her varied career. The same month she was featured on the Top 10 Fashion Models in Melbourne by Australia's Top Models alongside Alice Burdeu, Montana Cox, Martha Christie, among others.

In January 2020 Dikmans was on the Fitness First Australia magazine cover.

Real Food Healthy Body

Lilian Dikmans is a founder of Real Food Healthy Body. Launched in 2013, Real Food Healthy Body shares sweet and savoury recipes, catering for a gluten-free diet and suit a variety of other dietary requirements. These include grain free, low FODMAP, low fructose, dairy free for milk allergy, nut free for tree nut allergy, vegetarianism and veganism.

Dikmans launched Real Food Healthy Body as a place to share her recipes after she published Raw Desserts ebook.

A number of Real Food Healthy Body recipes developed by Dikmans have been featured in various international publications, including Cauliflower and Sweet Potato Soup in Independent Online and Shakshuka with Fresh Tomatoes and Spinach in BuzzFeed.

Muay Thai

Dikmans commenced fighting Muay Thai in late 2016 and made her pro debut on 4 March 2017, scoring a unanimous decision against Kiri Dale at the Roots 2: Jammin event held at St Kilda Town Hall. Her current fight record is 3-0.

Dikmans fought Paris Rose at Domination Muay Thai 21 held on October 27, 2018 in Perth, Australia. The bout ended in a unanimous draw.

Kickboxing record 

Legend:

References

External links
Official Website
Real Food Healthy Body

1985 births
Living people
Australian female models
Gluten-free cookbook writers
Models from Melbourne
People from Melbourne
University of Melbourne alumni
Australian women writers
Australian writers
Australian female kickboxers
Australian Muay Thai practitioners
Female Muay Thai practitioners
Australian women lawyers
Lawyers from Melbourne